RGN or Rgn may refer to:

 RGN, a human gene which codes for the protein regucalcin
 RGN hand grenade, a Soviet weapon
 Registered General Nurse, in the United Kingdom
 rgn, ISO 639-3 language code for the Romagnol language
 RGN, IATA code for Yangon International Airport in Myanmar